A Tree is Nice is a children's picture book written by Janice May Udry and illustrated by Marc Simont. It was published by Harper and Brothers in 1956, and won the Caldecott Medal in 1957. The book tells Udry's poetic opinion on why trees are nice: "Trees are pretty. They fill up the sky. If you have a tree, you can climb up its trunk, roll in its leaves, or hang a swing from one of its limbs. Cows and babies can nap in the shade of a tree. Birds can make nests in the branches. A tree is good to have around. A tree is nice."

In a retrospective essay about the Caldecott Medal-winning books from 1956 to 1965, Norma R. Fryatt wrote, "The book becomes one of the most convincing sermons on conservation yet done for young children."

References

1956 children's books
American picture books
Caldecott Medal–winning works
Books illustrated by Marc Simont
Harper & Brothers books